Salvador Ruíz de Chávez Ochoa (born 5 December 1938 in Mexico City) is a Mexican former swimmer who competed in the 1964 Summer Olympics and in the 1968 Summer Olympics.

References

1948 births
Living people
Mexican male swimmers
Swimmers from Mexico City
Mexican male freestyle swimmers
Olympic swimmers of Mexico
Swimmers at the 1964 Summer Olympics
Swimmers at the 1968 Summer Olympics
Central American and Caribbean Games gold medalists for Mexico
Competitors at the 1966 Central American and Caribbean Games
Central American and Caribbean Games medalists in swimming
20th-century Mexican people
21st-century Mexican people